Karin Shifrin (born in Jerusalem) is an Israeli mezzo-soprano opera singer. She regularly performs in Israel and Europe. Since the age of 24, she sang in concerts with the Israel Philharmonic Orchestra, and with the Teatro Comunale di Bologna orchestra, as well as other orchestras. Shifrin has been performing in the Israeli opera since 2005.

Career

Shifrin graduated her B.Mus. degree (with honors) in the Buchmann-Mehta Music Academy at the Tel-Aviv University. Her vocal instructors were Tamar Rachum (Israel), Kammersängerin Hilde Zadek (Austria) and Patricia McCaffrey (New York). Shifrin's debut with the Israeli Opera was at the age of 25.

Among the roles she performed:
"'Max and Moritz" (conducted by Gil Shohat)
The second Lady in The Magic Flute (conducted by Dan Ettinger)
The Woman Who Comforts at the world premiere of the contemporary opera adaptation to a Hanoch Levin play, The Child Dreams
Rossini's Cenerentola in a special production
Mrs. Smith, the leading role in a contemporary opera based upon Eugène Ionesco's "The Bald Soprano”

International performances
Some of Shifrin's international performances:
Israeli Philharmonic Orchestra, The Marriage of Figaro (as Marcellina) and Beethoven's 9th Symphony (soloist) (conducted by Zubin Mehta)
Various recitals in Germany and Britain
"Concert for peace" – a duo concert with a Palestinian singer at the "Il Violino Magico" festival in Venice, Italy
"Concert For Life And Peace" - which took place in Rome, Beth-Lechem and Jerusalem, with the Teatro Comunale di Bologna Orchestra  (conducted by Shlomo Mintz)
Several concerts in Poland in commemoration of the Holocaust victims (conducted by Omer Welber)
The Marschallin in Der Rosenkavalier and the title role in Arabella in Sigriswil, Bern and Bad Ragaz, Switzerland (Conducted by Andsreas Kowalewitz)
Rosina in The Barber of Seville with the National Symphony Orchestra of Kazakhstan (conducted by Vag Papian)
Romeo in I Capuletti ed I Montechi with the Aso  Orchestra Boston (conducted by Mark Swanson)

Awards
Some of the Awards Shifrin has received over her career include:
2002 - Buchman - Mehta music academy vocal competition (Israel) - Finalist and 2nd-place winner
2003 - Buchman - Mehta music academy vocal competition (Israel) - Finalist and 2nd-place winner
2003 - Internationaler Hild Zadek Gesangswettbewerb (Austria) - Finalist and 4th-place winner
2004 - International Hans Gabor Belvedere Gesangswettbewerb (Austria) - Semi-Finalist and special award winner
2008 - Iris Adami Corradetti Lyrical International Competition (Italy) - Semi Finalist
2009 - Concours international de chant de Clermont-Ferrand (France) - Semi Finalist
2011- The Montserrat caballe international competition (Spain) - Semi Finalist
In addition, she has obtained the "Hildegard Zadek Stiftung", the "AICF" and the "Opernwerkstatt Verena Keller"
scholarships for outstanding vocal, musical and creative achievements.

Australian/New Zealand tour
In 2012, Karin was invited by the Israeli Embassy in Australia to perform a special composition by Kobi Oshrat, in Melbourne with the Orchestra Victoria, in honour of Irena Sendler, a catholic Polish who saved Jews' lives during WWII. The New Zealand tour following that invitation included concerts in Wellington.

Diva De Lai

Since 2012, Karin has been the leading singer for international rock act Diva De Lai. The band's debut album, "Dylan at the Opera" (released October 2013) featured twelve Bob Dylan songs, reworked into various rock/opera styles.

The band's first music video,  a cover of Dylan's "Senor (Tales of Yankee Power)" (off his 1978's Street Legal) was also made available online in October 2013.

References

Sources
Israeli Opera, Artist's biography
Messer, Tova, "Mozart unites nations", Jerusalem Post, 26 December 2005
http://www.israel-opera.co.il/Eng/?CategoryID=337&ArticleID=700

External links
Official Website
Diva De Lai's Official Website
Karin Shifrin performing "Señor (Tales of Yankee Power)" on Diva De Lai's official YouTube Channel

1979 births
Living people
Israeli mezzo-sopranos
21st-century Israeli women opera singers
Operatic mezzo-sopranos
Tel Aviv University alumni
People from Jerusalem